Marek Ryan Larwood (born 2 June 1976) is an English comedian and actor. He is best known for the BBC Three sketch show Rush Hour and for being one third of the comedy trio We Are Klang.

Early life
Born in Norwich, Norfolk, Larwood lived in Wales before moving to the Isle of Wight. His forename is of Polish origin, as his mother had seen a 1975 documentary about a Polish schoolboy with a heart defect, who was looking forward to an operation. The operation was unsuccessful, and Marek's mother thought to name her son after the Polish schoolboy.

Career

Stand-up comedy
Larwood won the Laughing Horse New Act of The Year competition in 2003. He is part of the comic trio We Are Klang, along with Steve Hall and Greg Davies. They took their show Klangbang to the 2006 Edinburgh Fringe festival and were nominated for the Edinburgh Comedy Awards.

Television
Larwood has appeared in the sitcom Extras and the BBC sci-fi sitcom Hyperdrive. He featured as a main cast member of the first series of the CBBC show Sorry, I've Got No Head, but was absent from the second, meaning some of his characters were recast. He made a surprise return for the third series, but did not reclaim his original roles. In 2007, he appeared as Giacomo Casanova and Milo of Croton in CBBC's Ed and Oucho.

Larwood appeared in the 2008 ITV2 sketch show Laura, Ben & Him, with Laura Solon and Ben Willbond. He appeared in the sitcom adaptation of We Are Klang, the sketch show Rush Hour, and the improv game show Fast and Loose. From 2012 to 2014, he was a member of the BBC Three hidden camera comedy show Impractical Jokers UK.

He plays pub regular Lee in Romesh Ranganathan's sitcom The Reluctant Landlord.

Larwood appeared in ITV2's celebrity comedy show CelebAbility, alongside comedian Iain Stirling and Scarlett Moffat.

Films
Larwood made a cameo appearance as an amateur magician in the 2007 film Magicians.

Podcasts
Larwood presented a weekly podcast on classic and current films, Film Fandango, initially with fellow comedian David Reed and occasional guest host Danielle Ward, then with just Reed (when Ward left to have a baby), and then finally on his own.

Credits

Television

References

English stand-up comedians
English male television actors
1976 births
Living people
Actors from Norwich
English male comedians
People from Muswell Hill